Red Rock Lake or Lake Red Rock appears in the names of at least 19 geographic entities. Among these are:

Lake Red Rock (Des Moines River), a reservoir on the Des Moines River, southwest of Des Moines, Iowa
Red Rock Lakes Wilderness, in Montana
Red Rock Lake is a lake in Glacier National Park, Montana